Peelwa is a village in Jodhpur district, in the state of Rajasthan, India. The village's PIN code is 342309. It is part of Phalodi Tehsil.

References

Villages in Jodhpur district